Khowai Airport is a small airport located in Khowai, Tripura, India. It is managed by the Airports Authority of India and is non-operational.

Incidents
On 29 March 1955, a Dacota belonging to Airways (India) overran a wet runway and ended up in a ditch. Though there were no casualties, the aircraft was damaged beyond repair and written off.

References

External links
 Khowai on Airports Authority of India website
 Khowai on Jetrequest.com

Defunct airports in India
Airports in Tripura
Khowai district